One Step Ahead may refer to:
 "One Step Ahead" (Aretha Franklin song), 1965
 "One Step Ahead" (Split Enz song), 1980
 "One Step Ahead" (Nik Kershaw song), 1989
 "One Step Ahead" (Debbie Gibson song), 1990
 "One Step Ahead" (Jack Johnson song), 2022